Saznaq (also Romanized as Sazanaq, Saznagh, Saznak, Sezneq; also known as Sāzen) is a village in Chuqur Rural District, Tarom Sofla District, Qazvin County, Qazvin Province, Iran. At the 2006 census, its population was 123, in 27 families.

References 

Populated places in Qazvin County